The East Pacific Rise is a mid-ocean rise (termed an oceanic rise and not a mid-ocean ridge due to its higher rate of spreading that results in less elevation increase and more regular terrain), a divergent tectonic plate boundary located along the floor of the Pacific Ocean. It separates the Pacific Plate to the west from (north to south) the North American Plate, the Rivera Plate, the Cocos Plate, the Nazca Plate, and the Antarctic Plate. It runs south from the Gulf of California in the Salton Sea basin in Southern California to a point near 55° S, 130° W, where it joins the Pacific-Antarctic Ridge trending west-southwest towards Antarctica, near New Zealand (though in some uses the PAR is regarded as the southern section of the EPR). Much of the rise lies about 3200 km (2000 mi) off the South American coast and rises about 1,800–2,700 m (6,000–9,000 ft) above the surrounding seafloor.

Overview 

The oceanic crust is moving away from the East Pacific Rise to either side. On the eastern side of the rise the eastward-moving Cocos and Nazca plates meet the westward moving South American Plate and the North American Plate and are being subducted under them. The belt of volcanos along the Andes and the arc of volcanoes through Central America and Mexico are the direct results of this collision. Due east of the Baja California Peninsula, the Rise is sometimes referred to as the Gulf of California Rift Zone. In this area, newly formed oceanic crust is intermingled with rifted continental crust originating from the North American Plate.

Near Easter Island, the East Pacific Rise meets the Chile Rise at the Easter Island and Juan Fernandez microplates, trending off to the east where it subducts under the South American Plate at the Peru–Chile Trench along the coast of southern Chile.  The southern extension of the East Pacific Rise (called the Pacific-Antarctic Ridge) merges with the Southeast Indian Ridge at the Macquarie Triple Junction south of New Zealand.

Parts of the East Pacific Rise have oblique spreading, that is seafloor spreading that is not orthogonal to the nearest ridge segment.

Along the East Pacific Rise the hydrothermal vents called black smokers were first discovered by the RISE project in 1979, and have since been extensively studied. These vents are forming volcanogenic massive sulfide ore deposits on the ocean floor.  Many unique deep-water creatures have been found with vents, that subsist in a chemosynthetic ecosystem rather than one using photosynthesis. The southern stretch of the East Pacific Rise is one of the fastest-spreading divergent boundaries on Earth.

See also 

 Lamont seamount chain
 Mid-Atlantic Ridge
 Overlapping spreading centers
 Propagating rift
 Ring of Fire

References

External links

East Pacific Rise 2004 – Scripps Institution of Oceanography
Columbia University Researchers Find Key to the Formation of New Seafloor Spreading Centers – Columbia University

Plate tectonics
Underwater ridges of the Pacific Ocean
Geology of California
Salton Trough